Spokane is a film that premiered at the 2004 Sundance Film Festival, written and directed by Larry Kennar. The cast included Kyle Bornheimer and Jason Waters.  A short film, with a run time of only 29 minutes.

It was awarded an honorable mention in the international shorts category.

Plot

Two men bail on a wedding, go to a strip joint, and end up at a hotel.

External links

Sundance Film Festival award winners